Manuel Noriega (1934–2017) was the authoritarian military ruler of Panama.

Manuel Noriega may also refer to:
 Manuel Noriega (field hockey), Mexican field hockey player
 Manuel Noriega Ruiz, Mexican actor

See also
 Noriega